Carrying the Tune is a Celtic album by Kevin Crawford. It was released in 2012 on BallyO Records, and is Kevin's third solo release. The tracks on this album feature Kevin playing the flute and whistle and accompanied by guitar, bouzouki and bodhrán.

Musicians
Kevin Crawford - (flutes and whistles)
John Doyle - (guitars)
Mick Conneely - (bouzouki)
Brian Morrissey - (bodhrán)

Track listing
 McHugh’s / Michael Murphy’s / Humours of Tullycrine. (reels)
 Lá Ollámh / Lucky Lucky Day. (slip jigs)
 Autumn Apples / Cormac O’Lunny’s / Paddy Sean Nancy’s (reels)
 Flatwater Fran / Mrs Jean Campbell BSC. (waltzes)
 John McKenna’s / The Jointure / The Smithstown Jaunt. (jigs)
 Queen of May / Tom Dowd’s Favourite / Naughton’s. (hornpipe/reels)
 The Dear Irish Boy / The Hole in the Boat / Sally Sloane’s. (slow air/jigs)
 The Arra Mountains / Hunting the Hare / Petko. (slip jigs/horo)
 Taylor’s Fancy / Tanglony / Willie Clancy’s. (slides/single jig)
 Repeal the Union / The Ivy Leaf / The Hut in the Bog. (reels)
 Della the Diamond / Princess Polly / The Girl for Me. (jigs)
 The Mountain Lark / Jack in the Box. (reels)
 Ray’s Revenge / The Hula Hoop. (jig/reel)
 Ag Taisteal Na Blarnán (Travelling through Blarney) / Come West Along The Road. (slow air/reel)

References

External links
 Kevin Crawford's website
 Lúnasa's website

2012 albums
Kevin Crawford albums